The Sacred Heart Church, Rectory, School and Convent make up a historic Roman Catholic church complex in Cambridge, Massachusetts.  The church was built in the 1870s and 1880s to serve the parish first organized as the St. John the Evangelist Parish in 1842.  The cornerstone of the church was laid on 4 October 1874. It was dedicated in 1883, and opened for Divine Service on 12 November 1876. The rectory was added in 1885, and the convent and school followed in 1902.  The church is a Medieval Gothic structure designed by P. W. Ford.  The complex occupies an entire city block, and has been partly taken over for Cambridge city school administration.

The complex was listed on the National Register of Historic Places on 13 April 1982; #387395.

See also
St. John the Evangelist Church (Cambridge, Massachusetts)
National Register of Historic Places listings in Cambridge, Massachusetts

References

Roman Catholic churches completed in 1874
19th-century Roman Catholic church buildings in the United States
Churches on the National Register of Historic Places in Massachusetts
Roman Catholic churches in Cambridge, Massachusetts
Stone churches in Massachusetts
National Register of Historic Places in Cambridge, Massachusetts